The men's 100 metres event was part of the athletics programme at the 1920 Summer Olympics. The competition was held on August 15 and 16, 1920. The event was won by Charley Paddock of the United States. Great Britain won its first medal in the event, a bronze by Harry Edward.

Sixty sprinters from 22 nations competed, while Estonia's sole athlete in the event, Reinhold Saulmann, was entered but did not start the 100 m. No nation had more than 4 runners, suggesting the limit had been reduced from the 12 maximum in force in 1908 and 1912.

Background

This was the sixth time the event was held, having appeared at every Olympics since the first in 1896. None of the 1912 medalists returned in 1920. Notable entrants included Charley Paddock of the United States, the 1919 Inter-Allied Championship winner and Olympic favorite; fellow American Loren Murchison, who had defeated Paddock in the U.S. Olympic trials; and Harry Edward of Great Britain, the 1920 AAA Championships winner.

Egypt, Luxembourg, Monaco, New Zealand, Spain, and Switzerland were represented in the event for the first time. The new nation of Czechoslovakia also appeared for the first time, though Bohemia had previously competed separately. For the first time, Hungary did not compete (a result of not being invited after World War I)—making the United States the only nation to have appeared at each of the first six Olympic men's 100 metres events.

Competition format

The event expanded from three rounds (in 1908 and 1912) to four rounds: heats, quarterfinals, semifinals, and a final. There were 12 heats, of 4–6 athletes each, with the top 2 in each heat advancing to the quarterfinals. The 24 quarterfinalists were placed into 5 heats of 4 or 5 athletes. Again, the top 2 advanced. There were 2 heats of 5 semifinalists, this time with the top 3 advancing to the 6-man final.

Records

These were the standing world and Olympic records (in seconds) prior to the 1920 Summer Olympics.

(*) This was the only officially ratified world record in 1920, but there have been at least four runs in 10.5 seconds at that time. (see the records prior the 1912 Summer Olympics.)

Schedule

Results
Times were generally only published for the winners of each heat. Some of the times listed below are estimates based on contemporary reports of the races.

Round 1

Heat 1

Heat 2

Heat 3

Heat 4

Heat 5

Heat 6

Heat 7

Heat 8

Heat 9

Heat 10

Heat 11

Heat 12

Quarterfinals

Quarterfinal 1

Quarterfinal 2

Quarterfinal 3

Quarterfinal 4

Quarterfinal 5

Semifinals

Semifinal 1

Semifinal 2

Final

Murchison was affected badly by the start. The starter had told Paddock to adjust his position, causing Murchison to stand, thinking the full start sequence would be repeated. When it was not, Murchison was effectively eliminated as he was unprepared to run and could not catch the group.

Scholz was in the lead at the halfway mark before falling back to the back of the group. Paddock won by half a metre over Kirksey, with Edward a "chest behind" the silver medalist. The finish between Scholz and Ali-Khan for 4th and 5th places was close enough that the judges originally ruled Ali-Khan 4th before determining that Scholz was 4th.

References

Further reading
 
 

100 metres
1920